Imperial Bank may refer to

 Canadian Imperial Bank of Commerce, one of the "Big Five" banks in Canada, once the Imperial Bank of Canada
 Imperial Bank of China, first Chinese-owned bank modelled on Western banking practice
 Imperial Bank of India, oldest and the largest commercial bank of the Indian subcontinent, now State Bank of India
 Imperial Bank of Persia, British-owned state bank 
 Imperial Bank South Africa, commercial bank 
 Imperial Bank Limited, commercial bank in Kenya